Zindagi Tujh Ko Jiya is a Pakistani romantic soap which began on 22 February 2016 on Hum TV and aired Monday to Thursday evenings. It is directed by Abis Raza, written by Adam Azeen and produced by Momina Duraid  under her home production and Gem Stones Productions. It was previously aired on Hum Sitaray as 100 Din Ki Kahani but was not finished.

Synopsis
The drama revolves around a woman Maryam (Sanam Chaudhry) who loves Zeeshan (Furqan Qureshi). While, Maryam has a sister in law Samra (Eshita Syed), Zeeshan has two sisters: Safia and Sania. Safia and her mother wanted that Zeeshan marry Afshan, her husband Khalid's sister. His other sister supported Maryam as she thinks she is good for Zeeshan. Zeeshan and Maryam marry as a court marriage which angries her in-laws except Sania. Maryam, who is six months pregnant and counting days for her baby to be born. However, while she is looking forward to the big day, her husband is diagnosed with cancer and is left with approximately the same number of days to live.

Cast
 Sanam Chaudhry as Maryam
 Furqan Qureshi as Zeeshan
 Zara Tareen as Safia
 Eshita Syed as Samra
 Mazhar Ali as Maryam's dad
 Aamir Qureshi as Bilal
 Seema Seher
 Komal Iqbal as Sania

Controversy

HUM was accused of having copied their sister channel's show '100 Din Ki Kahani' and splitting the serial episodes up into small daily soap episodes.

References

External links
 
 Zindagi Tujh Ko Jiya official Video channel
 

Hum TV
Hum Network Limited
Hum TV original programming
Urdu-language television shows
Pakistani drama television series
Serial drama television series
2016 Pakistani television series debuts
2016 Pakistani television series endings
Television series about dysfunctional families
Television series set in Lahore
Television series set in Punjab, Pakistan